All Roads Lead to Rome is a 2015 romantic comedy film directed by Ella Lemhagen and written by Josh Appignanesi and Cindy Myers. The film stars Sarah Jessica Parker, Raoul Bova, Rosie Day, Paz Vega, and Claudia Cardinale.

Plot
Set in valleys of Tuscany, Maggie returns to a town where she spent her youth, along with her daughter, when she comes across her ex Luca and his mother Carmen, who live in a villa nearby. Decades earlier, Luca and Maggie were wildly in love, but she left one day for America and cut off communication with Luca completely. Luca, who still harbours feelings for Maggie, tries to win her back.

Meanwhile, Maggie's daughter Summer is desperate to get back to America and her selfish boyfriend Tyler (who wants her to take the rap for a recent drug charge, arguing that as she's a juvenile she'd receive a less serious sentence than him), and Luca's mother Carmen wants to unite and marry her 60s youth flame Marcellino, whom she had been recently exchanging love letters with. In the chaos that follows, Summer and Carmen steal Luca's car and race for Rome, where Carmen and Marcellino have planned their secret wedding at a church. Summer, initially planning to leave for America via Rome airport, on seeing the honor and love of Carmen realizes that she is being used by Tyler, and surprisingly finds love in farm girl Ermenegilda. Maggie and Luca, racing behind the two, also bicker about their past, and rekindle their love as they head for Rome.

Cast 
 Sarah Jessica Parker as Maggie Falk, an American journalist revisiting Italy with her rebellious daughter
 Raoul Bova as Luca, Maggie's former love interest from a visit decades earlier to Italy 
 Claudia Cardinale as Carmen, Luca's mother
 Rosie Day as Summer Falk, Maggie's daughter 
 Paz Vega as Giulia Carni, a television reporter and Luca's one-time love interest
 Marco Bonini as Inspector Moravia
 Nadir Caselli as Valentina, Luca's daughter
 Shel Shapiro as Marcellino, Carmen's pop group bandmate from the 60s
 Rocio Muñoz as Ermenegilda, Summer's newfound lesbian love interest

Production 
Casting announcements were made in October 2014. Shel Shapiro, who plays Carmen's love interest from their 1960s pop band in the film, was actually a member of the 1960s Italian pop group The Rokes. Rocio Munoz, who helps the troubled Summer realize her lesbian side, is the real life partner of Raoul Bova, the film's male lead – the couple had their first child in December 2015, the same month the film was released.

Filming began on October 20, 2014, in Rome, Italy.

Release 
The film saw limited release in international markets, earning just $524,368 in box office receipts.

Momentum Pictures acquired the North American rights to the film in February 2016, releasing it direct-to-video and video on demand for the North American market in March 2016.

References

External links 
 
 

2015 films
American romantic comedy films
2015 romantic comedy films
Metaphors referring to places
Films shot in Rome
Films set in Rome
Entertainment One films
2010s English-language films
2010s American films